Haixialu station is a station on Loop line of Chongqing Rail Transit in Chongqing municipality, China. It is located in Nan'an District, Chongqing, and opened in 2018.

References

Railway stations in Chongqing
Railway stations in China opened in 2018
Chongqing Rail Transit stations